Mohamed Al Aich (born 30 July 1981) is an Algerian rower. He competed in the men's single sculls event at the 2004 Summer Olympics.

References

External links
 

1981 births
Living people
Algerian male rowers
Olympic rowers of Algeria
Rowers at the 2004 Summer Olympics
Sportspeople from Oran
21st-century Algerian people